Antoine Dupré (1782–1816) was an early Haitian poet, songwriter, and playwright. He was one of the first published poets and one of the first performed playwrights of independent Haiti. He is known for his historical works, such as the poems Hymne à la Liberté and Le Rêve d'un Haytien, and the plays La Mort du Général Lamarre and La Jeune Fille. Dupré was killed in a duel  at about 34 years of age.

List of Works

 "Un hymne à  la liberté (1812."
 "La jeune fille (comedy)"
 "Le miroir"
 "La mort du général Lamarre (drame)"
 "Le rêve d'un Haïtien."
 "Vers pour être gravés au bas d'un buste de Pétion."

References

External links
 

1782 births
1816 deaths
Haitian male poets
19th-century Haitian poets
19th-century Haitian dramatists and playwrights
Haitian male dramatists and playwrights
19th-century male writers